Elmer's Candid Camera is a 1940 Warner Bros. Merrie Melodies cartoon short directed by Chuck Jones. The short was released on March 2, 1940, and features Elmer Fudd and an early Bugs Bunny prototype.

This is the first appearance of a redesigned Elmer Fudd, a character previously known as "Elmer" on the Lobby cards for The Isle of Pingo Pongo (1938) and Cinderella Meets Fella (1938), and even on screen in A Feud There Was (1938) and was also referred to as "Egghead's Brother" on the Vitaphone Publicity sheet for "Cinderella Meets Fella" (1938) which was shown on Michael Barrier's website (and now voiced by Arthur Q. Bryan). It s also the fourth appearance of the prototype rabbit that would later evolve into Bugs Bunny. Apart from making a fool of Elmer Fudd, the usual characteristics are absent; the voice used by Mel Blanc is closer to Daffy Duck (without the lisp) than its mature form.

Plot

Elmer is reading a book on how to photograph wildlife. He walks along whistling as he holds the camera. He finds a rabbit and wants to take a picture of him. The rabbit finds himself a convenient victim to harass as Elmer tries to photograph him. Elmer points to where the rabbit was sleeping and tells him that he wants to take a picture of him. This tormenting eventually drives Elmer insane, causing him to jump into a lake and nearly drown. The rabbit saves him, ensures that Elmer is perfectly all right – and promptly kicks him straight back into the lake. Then, the rabbit throws Elmer's "How To Photograph Wildlife" book on his head, thus ending the cartoon as the screen irises out.

Comments by Chuck Jones
Chuck Jones would go on to express his dissatisfaction as to how the short turned out. In his autobiography Chuck Amuck: The Life and Times of an Animated Cartoonist, he stated:

Home media 
 VHS- Cartoon Moviestars: Elmer!
 VHS- Looney Tunes Collectors Edition: Wabbit Tales
 Laserdisc- Bugs! and Elmer!
 Laserdisc- Golden Age of Looney Tunes Vol 2
 DVD- Looney Tunes Golden Collection: Volume 1
 DVD- Looney Tunes Spotlight Collection: Volume 1
 DVD- The Essential Bugs Bunny
 Blu-ray- Looney Tunes Platinum Collection: Volume 2
 Blu-ray- Bugs Bunny 80th Anniversary Collection

References

External links

 
 Elmer's Candid Camera on the Internet Archive

1940 films
1940 short films
1940 comedy films
1940 animated films
1940s animated short films
1940s Warner Bros. animated short films
Merrie Melodies short films
Bugs Bunny films
Elmer Fudd films
Films about photographers
Films set in forests
Short films directed by Chuck Jones
Films produced by Leon Schlesinger
Warner Bros. Cartoons animated short films
1940s English-language films